Lavacherie is a village of Wallonia and a district of the municipality of Sainte-Ode, located in the province of Luxembourg, Belgium.

The village was historically subjected to the lords of La Roche-en-Ardenne. In 1814, the village was occupied by Cossacks and Prussian troops during the Napoleonic Wars. The village church contains stained glass windows of unusual quality.

References

External links

Former municipalities of Luxembourg (Belgium)